"Good Girl" is a song by American recording artist Alexis Jordan, taken from her self-titled debut album. It was released as the album's second single on February 18, 2011. The dance-pop song was written by Autumn Rowe, Stargate, Sandy Vee and Espionage, and it was produced by Stargate and Sandy Vee. Jordan has said the song is a "girl’s anthem" about how "you can better yourself, even if your past isn’t as good as your present." "Good Girl" debuted at number six in the United Kingdom, and charted at number fifteen in Ireland. In the United States, the song peaked at the top of the Hot Dance Club Songs chart.

Critical reception
Nick Levine of Digital Spy awarded the song four out of five stars, and wrote "Call us naive, but with beats this struttable, verses so irresistibly bop-friendly and that, ahem, killer chorus, who wouldn't want to take a chance on her?"

Chart performance
On February 24, 2011 "Good Girl" debuted at number eighteen in Ireland, and has since peaked at number fifteen. In the United Kingdom, the song debuted at number six for the week ending date March 5, 2011, becoming Jordan's second top-ten single in the UK. In the United States, the song debuted at number fourteen on Billboards Hot Dance Club Songs chart on the issue dated March 19, 2011. It reached the top of the chart on the issue dated April 30, 2011, becoming Jordan's second consecutive number-one hit in the US.

Music video
The music video was directed by Erik White, it premiered on 25 January 2011 and was filmed late December 2010. The video commences with Jordan walking down a street wearing sunglasses, which is followed by the first scene in which Jordan begins to sing. The singer is shown dancing in an eccentrically choreographed scene; one of which is with her back-up dancers, and the other, which was with a male dancer Hefa Leone Tuita, in which Jordan and the male dancer were dancing in sync. Scenes also included Jordan dressed as a high-school girl eating an apple, and Jordan wearing an outfit consisting of PVC on a motorbike chewing bubble-gum. The video ends with screen-shots from different scenes in the video, followed by Jordan ruffling her hair, in which the camera zooms out and the text reads "ALEXIS JORDAN".

Track listing
UK digital EP
"Good Girl" – 3:56
"Good Girl" (Freemason's Radio Edit) – 3:31
"Good Girl" (Kim Fai Radio Edit) – 3:55
"Good Girl" (Freemason's Club Edit) – 8:47
"Good Girl" (Kim Fai Club Edit) – 6:52

Australian digital download
"Good Girl" – 3:56
"Good Girl" (Freemason's Radio Edit) – 3:31
"Good Girl" (Kim Fai Radio Edit) – 3:55

Credits and personnel
Autumn Rowe – songwriter
StarGate (Mikkel S. Eriksen and Tor Erik Hermansen) – songwriter, producer and instrumentation
Sandy Vee – songwriter, producer and instrumentation
Espionage (Espen Lind and Amund Björklund) – songwriter
Mikkel S. Eriksen – recording
Miles Walker – recording assistant
Antonio Resendiz – recording assistant
Phil Tan – mixing
Damien Lewis – additional and assistant engineering
Espen Lind – guitar
Tom Coyne – mastering

Credits adapted from Alexis Jordan album booklet.

Charts

"Good Girl" charted on the Ultratip Flanders chart in Belgium and peaked 9, which is the same as charting on the Ultratop 50 at 59.

Year-end charts

Certifications

Release history

See also
 List of number-one dance singles of 2011 (U.S.)

References

2011 singles
Roc Nation singles
Alexis Jordan songs
Song recordings produced by Stargate (record producers)
Songs written by Espen Lind
Songs written by Amund Bjørklund
Songs written by Tor Erik Hermansen
Songs written by Mikkel Storleer Eriksen
Dance-pop songs
Songs written by Sandy Vee
Songs written by Autumn Rowe
Music videos directed by Erik White
Song recordings produced by Sandy Vee